The 2023 Nigerian Senate elections in Kwara State will be held on 25 February 2023, to elect the 3 federal Senators from Kwara State, one from each of the state's three senatorial districts. The elections will coincide with the 2023 presidential election, as well as other elections to the Senate and elections to the House of Representatives; with state elections being held two weeks later. Primaries were held between 4 April and 9 June 2022.

Background
In the previous Senate elections, none of the three incumbent senators were returned as Mohammed Shaaba Lafiagi (PDP-North) retired from the Senate while both Bukola Saraki (PDP-Central) and Rafiu Adebayo Ibrahim (PDP-South) lost re-election. In the North district, Suleiman Sadiq Umar (APC) gained the seat for the APC with 74% while Saraki lost in the Central district to Ibrahim Yahaya Oloriegbe, who obtained 63% of the vote; similarly, Ibrahim was unseated by Lola Ashiru, who got 66%. These results were a part of the APC-led Ó Tó Gẹ́ movement against the Saraki dynasty as every House of Representatives seat was won by the APC, it won a majority in the state House of Assembly, and Buhari won the state in the presidential election by a wide margin.

Overview

Summary

Kwara Central 

The Kwara Central Senatorial District covers the local government areas of Asa, Ilorin East, Ilorin South, and Ilorin West. The incumbent Ibrahim Yahaya Oloriegbe (APC), who was elected with 63.2% of the vote in 2019, ran for re-election but lost renomination.

Primary elections

All Progressives Congress 

Before the primary, pundits noted five major candidates: incumbent Oloriegbe, Abdulfatai Yahaya Seriki, Saliu Mustapha, Yinka Aluko and former Senator Khairat Abdulrazaq-Gwadabe—the sister of Governor AbdulRahman AbdulRazaq; Aluko and Abdulrazaq-Gwadabe withdrew prior to the primary. On the primary date, the exercise held in Ilorin and resulted in the nomination of Mustapha as Seriki and
Oloriegbe came second and third place, respectively. In June, Oloriegbe admitted to bribing delegates and receiving refunds from those that did not vote for him; leaked audio from Oloriegbe also revealed that he blamed Governor AbdulRahman AbdulRazaq for the loss and refused to campaign for AbdulRazaq's re-election.

People's Democratic Party 

Initially the PDP primary was overshadowed by rumours that former Senator (and de facto Kwara PDP leader) Bukola Saraki would run for the seat again. When he instead announced a presidential run, four candidates purchased forms—former minister Bolaji Abdullahi, Sarat Adebayo, Abubakar Kawu Baraje, and Abubakar Amuda-Kannike; however, the Saraki rumours still dominated the primary conversation as observers questioned if Saraki would still run for Senate as a backup plan if unsuccessful in his presidential bid. In early April, Saraki and other Kwara PDP leadership effectively guaranteed Abdullahi would become nominee by zoning the nomination to his LGA—Ilorin West; the move was made official later that month when the other aspirants withdrew and backed Abdullahi as the "consensus" pick. On the primary date, Abdullahi was nominated via affirmation. Despite the rumours, Saraki did not drop to the senatorial race after losing the PDP presidential primary and thus Abdullahi remained the nominee.

Campaign 
After the primaries, nominations showed that the general election would be the first election in the district since 1999 to not have a Saraki on the ballot. For the general election campaign, observers noted the Saraki family's past strength in the district as a potential boost for Abdullahi, a Saraki loyalist, but also pointed out Bukola Saraki's substantial loss in 2019. For Mustapha and SDP nominee Ridwanullahi Apaokagi, pundits claimed the defections from the APC to the SDP could help Apaokagi despite his party's relatively small size. In July and August, the Mustapha and Abdullahi campaigns were noted as being among several election campaigns that used the catastrophic Alanamu Market fire to hawk for votes. Later analysis noted Oloriegbe's anger at Governor AbdulRahman AbdulRazaq over the primary result as a potential harm to Mustapha's campaign while his traditional title of the Turaki Ilorin could boost his candidacy. In December 2022, reporting from The Nation identified the closeness of the race while noting the effect of Suleiman Makanjuola Ajadi (ADC).

General election

Results

Kwara North 

The Kwara North Senatorial District covers the local government areas of Baruten, Edu, Pategi, Kaiama, and Moro. The district is noted its majority-ethnic minority makeup with non-Yorubas forming the majority of the population. The incumbent Suleiman Sadiq Umar (APC), who was elected with 73.9% of the vote in 2019, is seeking re-election.

Primary elections

All Progressives Congress 

On the primary date, two candidates contested an indirect primary that ended with Umar's renomination over Tauheed Daudu Toyin by a significant margin.

People's Democratic Party 

Unlike nearly every other Kwara PDP primary, the North senatorial primary was not decided using the consensus method as former MHR Aisha Ahman Pategi insisted on a primary against former commissioner Isa Adamu Bawa. Bawa was backed by the state party as, in exchange for micro-zoning the gubernatorial nomination to the Edu-Moro-Pategi area, state party leadership agreed to back a senatorial candidate from the Baruten-Kaiama area. At the primary in Edu LGA, Bawa defeated Ahman Pategi by a wide margin.

Campaign 
In a December 2022 senate campaign analysis piece, The Nation reporters categorized the election as a threeway race between Umar, Bawa, and Jiya (NNPP).

General election

Results

Kwara South 

The Kwara South Senatorial District covers the local government areas of Ekiti, Oke Ero, Offa, Ifelodun, Irepodun, Isin, and Oyun. Incumbent Lola Ashiru (APC), who was elected with 65.5% of the vote in 2019, is seeking re-election.

Primary elections

All Progressives Congress 

Before the primary, pundits noted three major candidates: incumbent Ashiru, MHR Raheem Olawuyi, and Suleiman Makanjuola Ajadi. On the primary date, the indirect primary ended with Ashiru winning renomination after results showed him defeating Olawuyi by a narrow four vote margin.

People's Democratic Party 

Like in Kwara Central, the state PDP organized a process to find a "consensus" nominee; however, Saraki and other PDP leadership effectively guaranteed the nomination to former Senator Rafiu Adebayo Ibrahim by zoning the nomination to his LGA—Oyun—in early April. Thus the process resulted in Ibrahim being selected as the "consensus" pick. On the primary date, Ibrahim was nominated via affirmation.

General election

Results

Notes

See also 
 2023 Nigerian Senate election
 2023 Nigerian elections

References 

Kwara State senatorial elections
2023 Kwara State elections
Kwara State Senate elections